Camera d'albergo is a 1981 Italian comedy film written and directed by Mario Monicelli. Ida Di Benedetto won the David di Donatello for Best Supporting Actress and Ruggero Mastroianni won the David di Donatello for Best Editing.

Cast 
 Vittorio Gassman: Achille Mengaroni
 Monica Vitti: Flaminia
 Enrico Montesano: Fausto Talponi
 Roger Pierre: Cesare De Blasi
 Béatrice Bruno: Emma
 Ida Di Benedetto: Moglie vergine
 Néstor Garay: Cesare Di Blasi
 Gianni Agus:  Se stesso
 Franco Ferrini: Gianni
 Daniele Formica: Aldo 
Nando Paone: Guido Bollati
Paul Muller: Hans
Isa Danieli: Maria

References

External links

1981 films
Commedia all'italiana
Films directed by Mario Monicelli
1981 comedy films
Films about technological impact
Self-reflexive films
1980s Italian-language films
1980s Italian films